This article is a list of historic places in Regina, Saskatchewan entered on the Canadian Register of Historic Places, whether they are federal, provincial, or municipal.

List of historic places

See also 

 List of National Historic Sites of Canada in Saskatchewan

Regina

fr:Liste des lieux patrimoniaux de la Saskatchewan